Jephtha Earl Cobblestone Farmhouse is a historic home located at Benton in Yates County, New York.  The farmhouse was built about 1850-1860 and is an example of Italianate style, cobblestone domestic architecture. The main block is a two-story, "L" shaped mass with a cross gable roof and pedimented front gable, connecting a number of wings.  It is built of tiny, reddish oval shaped cobbles. The farmhouse is among the nine surviving cobblestone buildings in Yates County.

It was listed on the National Register of Historic Places in 1992.

References

Houses completed in 1860
Houses on the National Register of Historic Places in New York (state)
Cobblestone architecture
Italianate architecture in New York (state)
Houses in Yates County, New York
National Register of Historic Places in Yates County, New York